Monk & Neagle were an American Contemporary Christian music duo from Amarillo, Texas, United States, being composed of Trent Monk and Michael Neagle.

The band members were Trent Monk (Lead Guitarist/Vocalist), Michael Neagle (Lead Guitarist/Vocalist), John Catchings (Cello), David Davidson (Violin), Dan Needham (Drums), Steve Brewster (Drums), Ben Shive (Accordion/Piano/Wurlitzer), Calvin Turner (Bass Guitar), Jovaun Woods (Background Vocals), Jerard Woods (Background Vocals) and Paul Moak (Electric Guitar).

History
Monk and Neagle met in college; after graduating, Neagle worked as a pastor while Monk released two solo albums through Grassroots Music, I Wait (1999) and Stars Would Fall (2003). 

In 2003, the two began performing together when Monk asked Neagle to play with him on tour with Shane and Shane. Neagle released his own independent solo record before the two officially signed with Flicker Records as a group. Their debut self-titled album followed in August 2004. Monk and Neagle as of recently have signed with Reunion Records. 

Their second album, The Twenty-First Time, was released in 2007, and peaked at #17 on Billboard's Top Christian Albums chart and #12 on the Heatseekers chart. As of January 2011, the duo's website is no longer registered, and they no longer appear on the roster of artists at Flicker Records.

Trent Monk is now living in Nashville, Tennessee and tours as a solo artist. In 2012, he re-partnered with Ed Cash, re-recorded the song "Beautiful You] and released it independently to Christian radio. It reached the top-10 on radio and top-50 songs on Billboard's Top Christian Songs of 2012. In 2013, Trent and Ed Cash recorded another Trent Monk single, "Rise".

Discography
Monk & Neagle (Flicker Records, 2004)
The Twenty-First Time (Flicker, 2007)

References

American Christian musical groups
Flicker Records artists
Musical groups from Texas
Musical groups established in 2003